James Evan Williams was a Welsh Anglican priest in the first half the 20th century who rose to become Archdeacon of Wrexham.

Williams was educated at Christ's College, Cambridge. He was ordained Deacon in 1891; and Priest in 1892. After a curacy in Bangor he held incumbencies in Bontddu, Portmadoc,  Wrexham and Gresford. He was also Treasurer of St Asaph Cathedral from 1930 until his death on 12 February 1953.

References

Alumni of Christ's College, Cambridge
20th-century Welsh Anglican priests
Archdeacons of Wrexham
1953 deaths